Albert Davies may refer to:

 Albert Davies (politician) (1900–1953), British Labour Party politician, MP 1945–1953
 Albert Davies (EastEnders), a minor character in the BBC soap EastEnders
 Albert Thomas Davies (1869–1940), Shrewsbury Town F.C. and Wales international footballer 
 Albert Emil Davies (1875–1950), British politician and writer

See also
Albert Davis (disambiguation)
Al Davies (disambiguation)